A paramedic is a healthcare professional who responds to emergency calls for medical help outside of a hospital. Paramedics mainly work as part of the emergency medical services (EMS), most often in ambulances. The scope of practice of a paramedic varies among countries, but generally includes autonomous decision making around the emergency care of patients.

Not all ambulance personnel are paramedics, although the term is sometimes used informally to refer to any ambulance personnel. In some English-speaking countries, there is an official distinction between paramedics and emergency medical technicians (or emergency care assistants), in which paramedics have additional educational requirements and scope of practice.

Duties and functions
The paramedic role is closely related to other healthcare positions, especially the emergency medical technician, with paramedics often being at a higher grade with more responsibility and autonomy following substantially greater education and training. The primary role of a paramedic is to stabilize people with life-threatening injuries and transport these patients to a higher level of care (typically an emergency department). Due to the nature of their job, paramedics work in many environments, including roadways, people's homes, and depending on their qualifications, wilderness environments, hospitals, aircraft, and with SWAT teams during police operations. Paramedics also work in non-emergency situations, such as transporting chronically ill patients to and from treatment centers and in some areas, address social determinants of health and provide in-home care to ill patients at risk of hospitalization (a practice known as community paramedicine).

The role of a paramedic varies widely across the world, as EMS providers operate with many different models of care. In the Anglo-American model, paramedics are autonomous decision-makers. In some countries such as the United Kingdom and South Africa, the paramedic role has developed into an autonomous health profession. In the Franco-German model, ambulance care is led by physicians. In some versions of this model, such as France, there is no direct equivalent to a paramedic. Ambulance staff have either the more advanced qualifications of a physician or less advanced training in first aid. In other versions of the Franco-German model, such as Germany, paramedics do exist. Their role is to support a physician in the field, in a role more akin to a hospital nurse, rather than operating with clinical autonomy.

The development of the profession has been a gradual move from simply transporting patients to hospital, to more advanced treatments in the field. In some countries, the paramedic may take on the role as part of a system to prevent hospitalisation entirely and, through practitioners, are able to prescribe certain medications, or undertaking 'see and refer' visits, where the paramedic directly refers a patient to specialist services without taking them to hospital.

Occupational hazards 
Paramedics are exposed to a variety of hazards such as lifting patients and equipment, treating those with infectious disease, handling hazardous substances, and transportation via ground or air vehicles. Employers can prevent occupational illness or injury by providing safe patient handling equipment, implementing a training program to educate paramedics on job hazards, and supplying PPE such as respirators, gloves, and isolation gowns when dealing with biological hazards.

Infectious disease has become a major concern, in light of the COVID-19 pandemic. In response, the U.S. Centers for Disease Control and Prevention and other agencies and organizations have issued guidance regarding workplace hazard controls for COVID-19. Some specific recommendations include modified call queries, symptom screening, universal PPE use, hand hygiene, physical distancing, and stringent disinfection protocols. Research on ambulance ventilation systems found that aerosols often recirculate throughout the compartment, creating a health hazard for paramedics when transporting sick patients capable of airborne transmission. Unidirectional airflow design can better protect workers.

History

Early history
Throughout the evolution of pre-hospitalization care, there has been an ongoing association with military conflict. One of the first indications of a formal process for managing injured people dates from the Imperial Legions of Rome, where aging Centurions, no longer able to fight, were given the task of organizing the removal of the wounded from the battlefield and providing some form of care. Such individuals, although not physicians, were probably among the world's earliest surgeons by default, being required to suture wounds and complete amputations. A similar situation existed in the Crusades, with the Knights Hospitaller of the Order of St. John of Jerusalem filling a similar function; this organisation continued, and evolved into what is now known throughout the Commonwealth of Nations as the St. John Ambulance and as the Order of Malta Ambulance Corps in the Republic of Ireland and various countries.

Early ambulance services
While civilian communities had organized ways to deal with prehospitalisation care and transportation of the sick and dying as far back as the bubonic plague in London between 1598 and 1665, such arrangements were typically ad hoc and temporary. In time, however, these arrangements began to formalize and become permanent. During the American Civil War, Jonathan Letterman devised a system of mobile field hospitals employing the first uses of the principles of triage. After returning home, some veterans began to attempt to apply what had they had seen on the battlefield to their own communities, and commenced the creation of volunteer life-saving squads and ambulance corps.

These early developments in formalized ambulance services were decided at local levels, and this led to services being provided by diverse operators such as the local hospital, police, fire brigade, or even funeral directors who often possessed the only local transport allowing a passenger to lie down. In most cases these ambulances were operated by drivers and attendants with little or no medical training, and it was some time before formal training began to appear in some units. An early example was the members of the Toronto Police Ambulance Service receiving a mandatory five days of training from St. John as early as 1889.

Prior to World War I motorized ambulances started to be developed, but once they proved their effectiveness on the battlefield during the war the concept spread rapidly to civilian systems. In terms of advanced skills, once again the military led the way. During World War II and the Korean War battlefield medics administered painkilling narcotics by injection in emergency situations, and pharmacists' mates on warships were permitted to do even more without the guidance of a physician. The Korean War also marked the first widespread use of helicopters to evacuate the wounded from forward positions to medical units, leading to the rise of the term "medevac". These innovations would not find their way into the civilian sphere for nearly twenty more years.

Prehospital emergency medical care
By the early 1960s experiments in improving medical care had begun in some civilian centres. One early experiment involved the provision of pre-hospital cardiac care by physicians in Belfast, Northern Ireland, in 1966. This was repeated in Toronto, Canada in 1968 using a single ambulance called Cardiac One, which was staffed by a regular ambulance crew, along with a hospital intern to perform the advanced procedures.

In 1966, a report called Accidental Death and Disability: The Neglected Disease of Modern Society—commonly known as The White Paper—was published in the United States. This paper presented data showing that soldiers who were seriously wounded on the battlefields during the Vietnam War had a better survival rate than individuals who were seriously injured in motor vehicle accidents on California's freeways. Key factors contributing to victim survival in transport to definitive care such as a hospital were identified as comprehensive trauma care, rapid transport to designated trauma facilities, and the presence of medical corpsmen who were trained to perform certain critical advanced medical procedures such as fluid replacement and airway management.

As a result of The White Paper, the US government moved to develop minimum standards for ambulance training, ambulance equipment and vehicle design. These new standards were incorporated into Federal Highway Safety legislation and the states were advised to either adopt these standards into state laws or risk a reduction in Federal highway safety funding. The "White Paper" also prompted the inception of a number of emergency medical service (EMS) pilot units across the US including paramedic programs. The success of these units led to a rapid transition to make them fully operational.

Freedom House Ambulance Service was the first civilian emergency medical service in the United States to be staffed by paramedics, most of whom were black. 
New York City's Saint Vincent's Hospital developed the United States' first Mobile Coronary Care Unit (MCCU) under the medical direction of William Grace, MD, and based on Frank Pantridge's MCCU project in Belfast, Northern Ireland. In 1967, Eugene Nagle, MD and Jim Hirschmann, MD helped pioneer the United States' first EKG telemetry transmission to a hospital and then in 1968, a functional paramedic program in conjunction with the City of Miami Fire Department. In 1969, the City of Columbus Fire Services joined with the Ohio State University Medical Center to develop the "HEARTMOBILE" paramedic program under the medical direction of James Warren, MD and Richard Lewis, MD. In 1969, the Haywood County (NC) Volunteer Rescue Squad developed a paramedic program (then called Mobile Intensive Care Technicians) under the medical direction of Ralph Feichter, MD. In 1969, the initial Los Angeles paramedic training program was instituted in conjunction with Harbor General Hospital, now Harbor–UCLA Medical Center, under the medical direction of J. Michael Criley, MD and James Lewis, MD. In 1969, the Seattle "Medic 1" paramedic program was developed in conjunction with the Harborview Medical Center under the medical direction of Leonard Cobb, MD. The Marietta (GA) initial paramedic project was instituted in the Fall of 1970 in conjunction with Kennestone Hospital and Metro Ambulance Service, Inc. under the medical direction of Luther Fortson, MD. The Los Angeles County and City established paramedic programs following the passage of The Wedsworth-Townsend Act in 1970. Other cities and states passed their own paramedic bills, leading to the formation of services across the US. Many other countries also followed suit, and paramedic units formed around the world.

In the military, however, the required telemetry and miniaturization technologies were more advanced, particularly due to initiatives such as the space program.  It would take several more years before these technologies drifted through to civilian applications. In North America, physicians were judged to be too expensive to be used in the pre-hospital setting, although such initiatives were implemented, and sometimes still operate, in European countries and Latin America.

Public notability
While doing background research at Los Angeles' UCLA Harbor Medical Center for a proposed new show about doctors, television producer Robert A. Cinader, working for Jack Webb, happened to encounter "firemen who spoke like doctors and worked with them".  This concept developed into the television series Emergency!, which ran from 1972 to 1977, portraying the exploits of this new profession called paramedics. The show gained popularity with emergency services personnel, the medical community, and the general public. When the show first aired in 1972, there were just six paramedic units operating in three pilot programs in the whole of the US, and the term paramedic was essentially unknown. By the time the program ended in 1977, there were paramedics operating in all fifty states. The show's technical advisor, James O. Page, was a pioneer of paramedicine and responsible for the UCLA paramedic program; he would go on to help establish paramedic programs throughout the US, and was the founding publisher of the Journal of Emergency Medical Services (JEMS). The JEMS magazine creation resulted from Page's previous purchase of the PARAMEDICS International magazine. Ron Stewart, the show's medical director, was instrumental in organizing emergency health services in southern California earlier in his career during the 1970s, in the paramedic program in Pittsburgh, and had a substantial role in the founding of the paramedic programs in Toronto and Nova Scotia, Canada.

Evolution and growth
Throughout the 1970s and 1980s, the paramedic field continued to evolve, with a shift in emphasis from patient transport to treatment both on scene and en route to hospitals. This led to some services changing their descriptions from "ambulance services" to "emergency medical services".

The training, knowledge-base, and skill sets of both paramedics and emergency medical technicians (EMTs) were typically determined by local medical directors based primarily on the perceived needs of the community along with affordability. There were also large differences between localities in the amount and type of training required, and how it would be provided. This ranged from in-service training in local systems, through community colleges, and up to university level education. This emphasis on increasing qualifications has followed the progression of other health professions such as nursing, which also progressed from on the job training to university level qualifications.

The variations in educational approaches and standards required for paramedics has led to large differences in the required qualifications between locations—both within individual countries and from country to country. Within the UK training is a three-year course equivalent to a bachelor's degree. Comparisons have been made between Paramedics and nurses; with nurses now requiring degree entry (BSc) the knowledge deficit is large between the two fields. This has led to many countries passing laws to protect the title of "paramedic" (or its local equivalent) from use by anyone except those qualified and experienced to a defined standard. This usually means that paramedics must be registered with the appropriate body in their country; for example all paramedics in the United Kingdom must by registered with the Health and Care Professions Council (HCPC) in order to call themselves a paramedic. In the United States, a similar system is operated by the National Registry of Emergency Medical Technicians (NREMT), although this is only accepted by forty of the fifty states.

As paramedicine has evolved, a great deal of both the curriculum and skill set has existed in a state of flux. Requirements often originated and evolved at the local level, and were based upon the preferences of physician advisers and medical directors. Recommended treatments would change regularly, often changing more like a fashion than a scientific discipline. Associated technologies also rapidly evolved and changed, with medical equipment manufacturers having to adapt equipment that worked inadequately outside of hospitals, to be able to cope with the less controlled pre-hospital environment.

Physicians began to take more interest in paramedics from a research perspective as well. By about 1990, the fluctuating trends began to diminish, being replaced by outcomes-based research. This research then drove further evolution of the practice of both paramedics and the emergency physicians who oversaw their work, with changes to procedures and protocols occurring only after significant research demonstrated their need and effectiveness (an example being ALS). Such changes affected everything from simple procedures such as CPR, to changes in drug protocols. As the profession grew, some paramedics went on to become not just research participants, but researchers in their own right, with their own projects and journal publications.  In 2010, the American Board of Emergency Medicine created a medical subspecialty for physicians who work in emergency medical services.

Changes in procedures also included the manner in which the work of paramedics was overseen and managed. In the early days medical control and oversight was direct and immediate, with paramedics calling into a local hospital and receiving orders for every individual procedure or drug. While this still occurs in some jurisdictions, it has become increasingly rare. Day-to-day operations largely moved from direct and immediate medical control to pre-written protocols or standing orders, with the paramedic typically seeking advice after the options in the standing orders had been exhausted.

Canada

While the evolution of paramedicine described above is focused largely on the US, many other countries followed a similar pattern, although often with significant variations. Canada, for example, attempted a pilot paramedic training program at Queen's University, Kingston, Ontario, in 1972. The program, which intended to upgrade the then mandatory 160 hours of training for ambulance attendants, was found to be too costly and premature. The program was abandoned after two years, and it was more than a decade before the legislative authority for its graduates to practice was put into place. An alternative program which provided 1,400 hours of training at the community college level prior to commencing employment was then tried, and made mandatory in 1977, with formal certification examinations being introduced in 1978. Similar programs occurred at roughly the same time in Alberta and British Columbia, with other Canadian provinces gradually following, but with their own education and certification requirements. Advanced Care Paramedics were not introduced until 1984, when Toronto trained its first group internally, before the process spread across the country. By 2010 the Ontario system involved a two-year community college based program, including both hospital and field clinical components, prior to designation as a Primary Care Paramedic, although it is starting to head towards a university degree-based program. The province of Ontario announced that by September 2021, the entry level primary care paramedic post-secondary program would be enhanced from a two-year diploma to a three-year advanced diploma in primary care paramedicine. Resultantly, advanced care paramedics in Ontario will require a minimum of four years of post-secondary education and critical care paramedics will require five years of post-secondary education.

Israel

In Israel, paramedics are trained in either of the following ways: a three-year degree in Emergency Medicine (B.EMS), a year and three months IDF training, or MADA training. Paramedics manage and provide medical guidelines in mass casualty incidents. They operate in MED evac and ambulances. They are legalized under the 1976 Doctors Ordinance (Decree). In a 2016 study at the Ben Gurion University of the Negev it was found that 73% of trained paramedics stop working within a five-year period, and 93% stop treating within 10 years.

United Kingdom

In the United Kingdom, ambulances were originally municipal services after the end of World War II. Training was frequently conducted internally, although national levels of coordination led to more standardization of staff training. Ambulance services were merged into county-level agencies in 1974, and then into regional agencies in 2006. The regional ambulance services, most often trusts, are under the authority of the National Health Service and there is now a significant standardization of training and skills.

The UK model has three levels of ambulance staff. In increasing order of clinical skill these are: emergency care assistants, ambulance technicians and paramedics.

The original route to becoming a paramedic was to join an NHS ambulance service and work towards the position from non-emergency patient transport roles through to the emergency division as a Qualified Ambulance Man/Woman and after qualifying those who wanted to increase their knowledge and skills joined the Association of Emergency Medical Technicians. This was an organisation run by members to promote and train Paramedics. The AEMT was supported by BASICS and large numbers of hospital doctors. Training took place at various locations in members off duty time and at their expense. Trainees followed a wide academic curriculum which led to a written exam. If successful they became Associates and entered the clinical phase of training. Attending hospitals they were trained in all the practical skills. The final examination was designed to put as much pressure on the candidate as possible. The hospital consultant would sign to say that he was happy for a passing candidate to treat their family.

In the 1970s some ambulance service training departments started offering advanced skill training under the direction of Peter Baskett (Consultant Anaesthetist at Frenchay Hospital, Bristol) and Douglas Chamberlain (Consultant Cardiologist in Brighton). This was the inception of the paramedic service in the UK, and subsequently was developed across Europe. In 1986 the NHSTA introduced the certificate in Extended Ambulance Aid. Existing AEMT Paramedics were forced to sit a conversion examination. The curriculum for the new qualification was substantially smaller cutting out a lot of anatomy and physiology as well as pharmacology and obstetrics. In November 1986 the examinations took place with the first certificates issued alphabetically. The candidate with highest score received certificate 177 and was the only Paramedic at Huntingdon. Training was introduced the following year but due to costs the time was kept to a minimum. The AEMT folded in the 1990s as the training offered was no longer recognised by the ambulance services. Equipment owned by the branches was given to hospitals.

The NHS Training Authority, NHSTA, (which became the NHS Training Directorate and then the NHS Training Division, which in turn became the Institute of Health and Care Development. The institute was acquired by the Edexcel examination board in 1998, and Edexcel was acquired by Pearson in 2004. Pearson continued to operate the IHCD 'brand' until 2016. This 'in-house' paramedic training was a modular programme, usually between 10 and 12 weeks, followed by time spent in a hospital emergency department, coronary care centre and operating theatre, assisting the anaesthetist and performing airway management techniques such as endotracheal intubation. Completion of the course allowed the paramedic to register with the Council for Professions Supplementary to Medicine (CPSM), which was superseded by the Health and Care Professions Council (HCPC), a regulatory body. It is worth noting that this route also took around 3 years if undertaken as quickly as possible. After the non emergency training, initially an 8-week clinical technician course was undertaken, with 750 mentored hours. Staff usually had to be a qualified technician for 2 years before applying for paramedic training noted above, a further 750 hours mentored had to be undertaken to complete the paramedic course to practice and demonstrate the skills learnt during the hospital placements and residential course.

Prior to regulation and closure of the title, the term "paramedic" was used by a variety of people with varying levels of ability. Paramedics could apply to register via a grandfather scheme which ended in 2002.

However, university qualifications are expected for paramedics, with the entry level being an Honours Bachelor of Science degree in Pre-Hospital Care or Paramedic Science.  As the title "Paramedic" is legally protected, those utilising must be registered with the Health and Care Professions Council (HCPC), and in order to qualify for registration you must meet the standards for registration, which include having a degree obtained through an approved course.

It is common for paramedics to have master's degrees in Advanced practice or Paramedic practice and is indeed a requisite for paramedic prescribing.

Paramedics work in various settings including NHS and Independent Ambulance Providers, Air Ambulances, Emergency Departments and other alternative settings.  Some paramedics have gone on to become Paramedic Practitioners, a role that practices independently in the pre-hospital environment in a capacity similar to that of a nurse practitioner. This is a fully autonomous role, and such senior paramedics are now working in hospitals, community teams such as rapid response teams, and also in increasing numbers in general practice, where their role includes acute presentations, complex chronic care and end of life management. They work as part of the allied health professional team including Doctors, Nurses, physician Associates, Physiotherapists, Associate Physicians, Health Care Assistant and Clinical Pharmacists. Paramedic Practitioners also undertake examinations modelled upon the MRCGP (a combination of applied knowledge exams, clinical skills and work place based assessment) in order to use the title "specialist". There are also now a growing number of these advanced paramedics who are independent and supplementary prescribers. There are also 'Critical Care Paramedics' who specialise in acute emergency incidents.  In 2018, the UK government changed legislation allowing Paramedics to independently prescribe, which will open new pathways to Paramedics to progress into. This came into force on 1 April 2018, but did not immediately affect practice as guidance was still being written.

United States

In the United States, the minimum standards for paramedic training is considered vocational, but many colleges offer paramedic associate degree or bachelor's degree options. Paramedic education programs typically follow the U.S. NHTSA EMS Curriculum, DOT or National Registry of EMTs. While many regionally accredited community colleges offer paramedic programs and two-year associate degrees, a handful of universities also offer a four-year bachelor's degree component. The national standard course minimum requires didactic and clinical hours for a paramedic program of 1,500 or more hours of classroom training and 500+ clinical hours to be accredited and nationally recognized. Calendar length typically varies from 12 months to upwards of two years, excluding degree options, EMT training, work experience, and prerequisites. It is required to be a certified Emergency Medical Technician prior to starting paramedic training. Entry requirements vary, but many paramedic programs also have prerequisites such as one year required work experience as an emergency medical technician, or anatomy and physiology courses from an accredited college or university. Paramedics in some states must attend up to 50+ hours of ongoing education, plus maintain Pediatric Advanced Life Support and Advanced Cardiac Life Support. National Registry requires 70 + hours to maintain its certification or one may re-certify through completing the written computer based adaptive testing again (between 90 and 120 questions) every two years.

Paramedicine continues to grow and evolve into a formal profession in its own right, complete with its own standards and body of knowledge, and in many locations paramedics have formed their own professional bodies. The early technicians with limited training, performing a small and specific set of procedures, has become a role beginning to require a foundation degree in countries such as Australia, South Africa, the UK, and increasingly in Canada and parts of the U.S. such as Oregon, where a degree is required for entry level practice.

Ukraine
As a part of Emergency Medicine Reform in 2017 Ministry of Healthcare introduced two specialties — "paramedic" and "emergency medical technician". A paramedic is a person with at least junior bachelor degree in "Healthcare" field. For a person with basic nine-year school education, the term of training is four years (junior bachelor's degree equivalent); with 11 years of schooling - two years for junior bachelor or 3–4 years for bachelor's degrees.

Structure of employment 

Paramedics are employed by a variety of different organizations, and the services they provide may occur under differing organizational structures, depending on the part of the world. A new and evolving role for paramedics involves the expansion of their practice into the provision of relatively basic primary health care and assessment services.

Some paramedics have begun to specialize their practice, frequently in association with the environment in which they will work. Some early examples of this involved aviation medicine and the use of helicopters, and the transfer of critical care patients between facilities. While some jurisdictions still use physicians, nurses, and technicians for transporting patients, increasingly this role falls to specialized senior and experienced paramedics. Other areas of specialization include such roles as tactical paramedics working in police units, marine paramedics, hazardous materials (Hazmat) teams, Heavy Urban Search and Rescue, and paramedics on offshore oil platforms, oil and mineral exploration teams, and in the military.

The majority of paramedics are employed by the emergency medical service for their area, although this employer could itself be working under a number of models, including a specific autonomous public ambulance service, a fire department, a hospital based service, or a private company working under contract. In Washington, firefighters have been offered free paramedic training. There are also many paramedics who volunteer for backcountry or wilderness rescue teams, and small town rescue squads. In the specific case of an ambulance service being maintained by a fire department, paramedics and EMTs may be required to maintain firefighting and rescue skills as well as medical skills, and vice versa. In some instances, such as Los Angeles County, a fire department may provide emergency medical services, but as a rapid response or rescue unit rather than a transport ambulance.

The provision of municipal ambulance services and paramedics, can vary by area, even within the same country or state. For instance, in Canada, the province of British Columbia operates a province-wide service (the British Columbia Ambulance Service) whereas in Ontario, the service is provided by each municipality, either as a distinct service, linked to the fire service, or contracted out to a third party.

Scope of Practice

Common skills
While there are varying degrees of training and expectations around the world, a set of skills practiced by paramedics in the pre-hospital setting commonly includes:

 Advanced cardiac life support, or ACLS, including cardiopulmonary resuscitation, defibrillation, cardioversion, transcutaneous pacing, and administration of cardiac drugs
 Patient assessment, including acquisition of vital signs, physical exam, chest auscultation, history taking, electrocardiogram acquisition and interpretation, capnography, pulse oximetry, point-of-care ultrasound and basic blood chemistry interpretation (glucose, lactate)
Airway management techniques including tracheal intubation, cricothyrotomy, rapid sequence induction, supraglottic airway insertion, manual repositioning, sterile suctioning, use of oropharyngeal and nasopharyngeal airway adjuncts, and manual removal of obstructions via direct laryngoscopy and use of magill forceps
 Thorocostomy and pericardiocentesis to relieve pneumothorax and pericardial tamponade
 Intravenous (IV) and intraosseous (IO) cannulation
 Oxygen administration and positive pressure ventilation via bag-valve-mask, CPAP device, or ventilator
 Fluid resuscitation
 Administration of emergency drugs/medications (see section below)
 Bleeding control and management of shock
 Spinal injury management, including immobilization and safe transport
 Fracture management, including assessment, splinting, and dislocation reduction 
 Obstetrics, including assessment, childbirth, and recognition of and procedures for obstetrical emergencies such as breech presentation, cord presentation, and placental abruption
 Management of burns, including classification, estimate of surface area, recognition of more serious burns, and treatment
 Triage of patients in a mass casualty incident
 Surgical procedures such as field amputation, escharotomy, or thorocotomy (if trained and credentialed)

Emergency Pharmacology
Paramedics carry and administer a wide array of emergency medications. The specific medications they are permitted to administer vary widely, based on local standards of care and protocols. For an accurate description of permitted drugs or procedures in a given location, it is necessary to contact that jurisdiction directly. A representative list of medications may commonly include:

 Analgesic medications such as aspirin, ketorolac and paracetamol (acetaminophen), used to relieve pain or decrease nausea and vomiting
 Narcotics like morphine, pethidine, fentanyl, and methoxyflurane, used to treat severe pain. 
 Beta and calcium channel blockers such as diltiazem, metoprolol and verapamil used to slow down excessively high heart rates or severe hypertension
 Parasympatholytic drug such as Atropine, also known as anticholinergic drugs, used to speed up slow bradycardic heart rates
 Sympathomimetics such as dopamine, dobutamine, norepinephrine, and epinephrine used for cardiac arrest, severe hypotension (low blood pressure), shock and sepsis. These are often known as "vasoactive" agents. 
Dextrose (often D50W, a solution of 50% dextrose in water), used to treat hypoglycemia (low blood sugar)
 Sedatives like midazolam, lorazepam, etomidate, and ketamine used to reduce the irritability or agitation of patients, to relieve symptoms of seizure, or provide procedural sedation
 Paralytics such as succinylcholine, rocuronium, and vecuronium, used when an emergency procedure such as rapid sequence intubation (RSI) is required
 Antipsychotics like haloperidol or ziprasidone, used to sedate combative patients
 Respiratory medications such as albuterol and ipratropium bromide used to treat conditions such as asthma and acute bronchitis
 Steroids such as hydrocortisone and methylprednisolone used to treat inflammatory respiratory conditions and adrenal crisis
 Cardiac medications such as nitroglycerin and aspirin are used to treat cardiac ailments such as angina and myocardial infarctions
 Diuretic medications such as furosemide to treat congestive heart failure and severe hypertension
 Antiarrhythmics such as amiodarone, adenosine, lidocaine and magnesium sulfate used to treat abnormal heart rhythms such as ventricular tachycardia and ventricular fibrillation
 Antiemetics such as promethazine or ondansetron used for nausea and vomiting
 Antidotes for a variety of toxins such as naloxone (opioids), pralidoxime (organophosphates), sodium bicarbonate (tricyclic antidepressants), and hydroxocobalamin (cyanide). 
Blood products and tranexamic acid in cases of hemorrhagic shock
 Broad spectrum antibiotics such as ceftriaxone or vancomycin for cases of sepsis
 Hormones like oxytocin to control post-partum bleeding

Skills by certification level
As described above, many jurisdictions have different levels of paramedic training, leading to variations in what procedures different paramedics may perform depending upon their qualifications. Three common general divisions of paramedic training are the basic technician, general paramedic or advanced technician, and advanced paramedic. Common skills that these three certification levels may practice are summarized in the table below. The skills for the higher levels automatically also assume those listed for lower levels.

Medicolegal authority
The medicolegal framework for paramedics is highly dependent on the overall structure of emergency medical services in the territory where they are working.

In many localities, paramedics operate as a direct extension of a physician medical director and practice as an extension of the medical director's license. In the United States, a physician delegates authority under an individual state's Medical Practice Act. This gives a paramedic the ability to practice within limited scope of practice in law, along with state DOH guidelines and medical control oversight. The authority to practice in this manner is granted in the form of standing orders (protocols) (off-line medical control) and direct physician consultation via phone or radio (on-line medical control). Under this paradigm, paramedics effectively assume the role of out-of-hospital field agents to regional emergency physicians, with independent clinical decision.

In places where paramedics are recognised health care professionals registered with an appropriate body, they can conduct all procedures authorised for their profession, including the administration of prescription medication, and are personally answerable to a regulator. For example, in the United Kingdom, the Health and Care Professions Council regulates paramedics and can censure or strike a paramedic from the register.

In some cases paramedics may gain further qualifications to extend their status to that of a paramedic practitioner or advanced paramedic, which may allow them to administer a wider range of drugs and use a wider range of clinical skills.

In some areas, paramedics are only permitted to practice many advanced skills while assisting a physician who is physically present, except for immediately life-threatening emergencies.

In entertainment
 Emergency! was a popular 1970s television series which centered on the work of paramedics in the Los Angeles County Fire Department, and the staff at the fictional Rampart Emergency Hospital. Emergency! has been widely credited with inspiring many municipalities in the United States to develop their own paramedic programs, and acted as an inspiration for many individuals to enter the fields of emergency medicine.  The show rated well for its entire production run (1972–77), as well as in syndicated reruns, and inspired a related cartoon series.
 Mother, Jugs & Speed is a 1976 comedy film, starring Bill Cosby, Raquel Welch, and Harvey Keitel. The film depicts a private ambulance company struggling to survive in Los Angeles, and gives an indication of the state of the ambulance industry just prior to its increased professionalism.
 Trauma Center is a 1983 American television medical drama focussing on the McKee Hospital Trauma Center, and two paramedics who had to rescue or save injured people before delivering them to the trauma center.
 Casualty is a long-running British BBC television series (1986–present), depicting the fictional Holby City Hospital's Accident and Emergency Department, and the related paramedics. Casualty has inspired the spin-off series, Holby City, and a number of made-for-television films.
 Paramedics is a 1988 American comedy film focusing on a group of paramedics in a US city.
 Paramedic: On the Front Lines of Medicine, is a 1988 autobiographical account of a paramedic's first year on the job by Peter Canning. A sequel, Rescue 471: A Paramedic's Stories was released in 2000.
 Bringing Out the Dead is a 1999 American drama film, directed by Martin Scorsese and starring Nicolas Cage, showing forty-eight hours in the life of a burnt-out hospital paramedic in New York's Hell's Kitchen. The film is based on the novel of the same name by Joe Connelly, a former New York City paramedic.
 Paramedics is an American reality television show that originally screened from 1999 to 2001, and now runs intermittently on the Discovery Health Channel. The show features the life and work of emergency medical squads in major urban centers in the United States.
 Third Watch (1999–2005) is an American television drama, parts of which focused on the firefighters and paramedics of the New York City Fire Department.
 Shinjuku Punk Rescue Ambulance is a 2000 Japanese comedy drama TV series which aired on Nippon Television in Japan. The story is about two young Tokyo Fire Department ambulance technicians at Shinjuku West District and working with medical staff of Juniso Hospital. The show is also demonstrating how to deal with various emergency scenarios with first aid techniques at the ending of each episode. 
 Into the Breach: A Year of Life and Death with EMS is a 2002 book written by J. A. Karam, focussing on real-life stories of paramedics, emergency medical technicians, and heavy-rescue specialists fighting to control trauma and medical emergencies.
 Saved is a 2006 medical television drama centered on a fictional paramedic, his partner, and their chaotic lives on and off the job.
 Black Flies is a 2008 American novel written by Shannon Burke, based on his experiences working as a paramedic in Harlem, New York.
 In NBC's sci fi drama Heroes (2006, 2010), the character Peter Petrelli uses his abilities to save 53 people while working as a paramedic. 
 Code Blue: Doctor-Heli (2008, 2010) is a Japanese television medical drama which aired on Fuji TV Network. It is centered on the lives and work of flight physician trainees with the air ambulance program of the fictional Shoyo University Hokubu Hospital Emergency Center.
 Trauma is a 2009–10 American television drama series focusing on a group of San Francisco Fire Department paramedics working in conjunction with the fictional trauma center of San Francisco City Hospital.
 Recruits: Paramedics is an Australian television series airing on Network Ten, depicting the work of trainee paramedics recently employed with the Ambulance Service of New South Wales.
 Denise Sherwood on Army Wives was a paramedic, having been a nurse beforehand and a 911 dispatcher later.
 F.S.D. is a 2011 Hong Kong action-drama TV series which was co-produced by RTHK and the Hong Kong Fire Service Department. It is focused on the work and lives of ambulancemen and firemen in the Hong Kong Fire Service Department. The second episode, "Caring with Love", and fifth episode, "Call for Duty", are centered on the ambulancemen and paramedics particularly.
 Sofia's Last Ambulance (2012) is a feature-length documentary by Ilian Metev about a dedicated ambulance crew in Sofia, Bulgaria. The film premiered at Cannes in 2012.
 Elite Brigade is a 2012 Hong Kong action-drama TV series co-produced by RTHK and the Hong Kong Fire Service Department after the previous series F.S.D. succeeded in 2011. The story carries on to tell the work of ambulancemen and firemen in the Hong Kong Fire Service Department. The third episode, "First Responders", is centered on the ambulancemen and paramedics who face a double-decker bus crash during rush hour, with mass victims on scene.
 Trauma Team, a surgery video game for the Nintendo Wii, features a playable paramedic named Maria Torres whose playstyle centers around managing and stabilizing multiple accident victims at once.
 In the game Metal Gear Solid 3, Dr. Clark, nicknamed Para-Medic, dreams of creating a unit of medics able to parachute down to an emergency location.
 Junior Paramedics is a British television series that was first broadcast on BBC Three on 27 February 2014. The series follows paramedics on a six-week placement with East Midlands Ambulance Service.
  Boston EMS is a medical documentary series which premiered on ABC on July 25, 2015. It follows one of America's most seasoned teams of first responders in Boston, Massachusetts. 
 Nightwatch is a 2015 American reality television show that airs on the A&E channel that focuses on the EMTs and paramedics of the New Orleans Emergency Medical Services, as well as the firefighters of the New Orleans Fire Department, and the police officers on the New Orleans Police Department.
 Ambulance, a BBC documentary which first aired in 2016, originally followed paramedics in the London Ambulance Service, and since 2017 has followed paramedics in the West Midlands Ambulance Service.
 Synchronic is a 2019 science-fiction horror film directed by Justin Benson and Aaron Moorhead that follows two New Orleans paramedics whose lives are ripped apart after a series of horrific deaths are caused by a new designer drug.

See also
Paramedics by country
Paramedics in Australia
Paramedics in Canada
Paramedics in France
Paramedics in Germany
Paramedics in Ireland
Paramedics in South Africa
Paramedics in the United Kingdom
Paramedics in the United States

Related fields
 Biophone
 Field medic
 Flight Paramedic
 Health care providers
 National Association of Emergency Medical Technicians
 National Registry of Emergency Medical Technicians

Other
Feldsher
List of EMS provider credentials

References

Further reading 
 Conaghan, Joseph. Coach and horses: my history in the ambulance dispute 1989/90. Glantaff House, 2010.

External links 

 National EMS Museum
 National Registry of Emergency Medical Technicians
 National Association of Emergency Medical Technicians
 NHTSA Emergency Medical Services National Page
 College of Paramedics (UK) 

Emergency medical responders
Health care occupations
Protective service occupations
Medical credentials